Leslie Barlow is an American visual artist in Minneapolis, Minnesota, predominantly focused on paintings that discuss themes of multiculturalism, identity, and family.

Early life and education 
Leslie Barlow was born and raised in South Minneapolis and attended Southwest High School. She received her Bachelor of Fine Arts in Studio Arts with a minor in Business Administration from the University of Wisconsin-Stout in 2011. After graduation held the position of intern and volunteer with Minneapolis-based contemporary art center The Soap Factory. Barlow went on to receive her Masters of Fine Arts degree from the Minneapolis College of Art and Design in Drawing and Painting in 2016.

Career 
After graduating from the Minneapolis College of Art and Design, Barlow has had an exhibition of her work, entitled Loving, and has had her work displayed in places such as the U.S. Bank Stadium. Barlow uses different mediums to create her pieces, ranging from strictly just paintings to mixed media pieces that use different materials, like how she "layers canvases and panels with a patchwork of fabrics that show through her figures..." Barlow's work tends to work within the themes of race, gender, sexuality, and family. These are very evident throughout her first significant exhibition, Loving, which tackles questions relating to all these various themes.

Artwork 
Barlow was raised in an interracial household, which has heavily influenced the content of her work. Her work focuses on the figure and narratives surrounding identity and multiculturalism.

Barlow's work is included in the permanent collections of the Minneapolis Institute of Art; Weisman Art Museum; Minnesota Museum of American Art; Minnesota Vikings Fine Art Collection; and the Minnesota Historical Society.

Loving 

Barlow's 2017 body of work, Loving, was created to discuss interracial relationships 50 years after the court case Loving v. Virginia, which was a U.S. Supreme Court case that banned states from prohibiting interracial marriages. Barlow was also attempting to make sense of interracial relationships in the Trump administration. Barlow's Loving was shown at an exhibition at Public Functionary in Minneapolis in March 2017. The exhibition features 10 portraits of interracial couples with skin tones are not typically represented in oil portraiture.

Barlow was chosen among 34 other local artists to create art pieces inspired by the Minnesota Vikings for the opening of the U.S. Bank Stadium, where Barlow created 6 massive portraits of former Vikings players.

Activism 
Barlow, alongside Ryan Stopera, Mackenzie Owens, and 30 or more Black and Indigenous people of color painted murals on boarded-up businesses throughout the Twin Cities in the weeks of civil unrest following the murder of George Floyd. The group, under the hashtag #creativesaftercurfew, raised money through for paint and supplies through individual donations and the support of businesses and grants such as Wet Paint, Blick Art Materials, and the Graves Foundation. They have completed murals at Fallout Arts in Minneapolis and plan to complete more at over 20 BIPOC-owned businesses.

Awards 
2019 McKnight Fellow for Visual Artists

Solo exhibitions 

 2021 – Within, Between, and Beyond, Minneapolis Institute of Art, MN

References

External links 

Living people
University of Wisconsin–Stout alumni
Minneapolis College of Art and Design alumni
21st-century American women artists
Artists from Minneapolis
African-American women artists
African-American painters
American women painters
21st-century American painters
1989 births
21st-century African-American women
21st-century African-American artists
20th-century African-American people
20th-century African-American women